Neufeld an der Leitha (meaning "new village on the Leitha") is a town in the district of Eisenstadt-Umgebung in the Austrian state of Burgenland. It lies on the river Leitha, which forms the border with Lower Austria.

Population

Nearby places

Notable residents 
 Hans Bögl (1899–1974), Governor of Burgenland 1964–1966, National Council 1959–1962
 Franz Erntl (1902–1990), painter
 Ludwig Leser (1890–1946), Governor of Burgenland 1945–1946
 Jürgen Mansberger (born 1988), footballer
 Fred Sinowatz (1929–2008), Federal Chancellor 1983–1986

Literature 
 Albert G. Absenger: 350 Jahre Neufeld. Eine chronikartige Geschichtsdarstellung. Stadtgemeinde Neufeld an der Leitha, Neufeld an der Leitha 2002.
 Albert Gernot Absenger: Chronik Neufeld III, Verdichtung der gesamten Ortshistorie als Folge- und Erweiterungsband von Lang- und Kurzfassung der 2002 erschienen chronikartigen Darstellung, Stadtgemeinde Neufeld an der Leitha, Neufeld an der Leitha 2007.
 Reinhold Arthofer: Festschrift 100 Jahre Evangelische Kirche A.B. Neufeld an der Leitha. 1904 - 2004. Selbstverlag der Evangelischen Pfarrgemeinde Eisenstadt, Eisenstadt 2004, .
 Peter Krajasich: Die jüdische Bevölkerung von Eisenstadt und Neufeld im Jahre 1735. In: Hanns Schmid (Hrsg.): Urgeschichte - Römerzeit - Mittelalter. Band 2: Festschrift Alois-J. Ohrenberger. Amt der Burgenländischen Landesregierung, Abteilung 7, Landesmuseum, Eisenstadt 1985, (Wissenschaftliche Arbeiten aus dem Burgenland 71), S. 241–248.
 Harald Prickler: Zur Frühgeschichte der Neufelder Industrie. Amt der Burgenländ. Landesregierung, Abt. 7 - Kultur, Wiss. und Archiv, Hauptreferat Landesarchiv und Landesbibliothek, Eisenstadt 2008, (Burgenländische Forschungen 97).

References 

Cities and towns in Eisenstadt-Umgebung District
Populated places on the Leitha